Reginald A. Foakes (18 October 1923 – 22 December 2013 in Stratford Upon Avon) was an English author and Shakespeare scholar. He has published works on Shakespeare and the Romantic poets and edited many of Shakespeare's plays in the Arden and New Cambridge editions. He also helped found the Shakespeare Institute in Stratford-upon-Avon. He was Professor Emeritus in the department of English literature at UCLA. He died at his home in Stratford-upon-Avon.

Beyond Shakespeare, his scholarly work also included editing the theatrical papers of Philip Henslowe, work on Samuel Taylor Coleridge's literary criticism.

In 2001, the University of Birmingham gave Foakes an honorary degree in honor of the 50th anniversary of their Shakespeare Institute in Stratford-upon-Avon.

References

Further reading
 Honouring Professor Reg Foakes
 In memory of Reg Foakes
Imagined Places: A life in the twentieth century (Xlibris, 2005), Foakes' autobiography.
Shakespeare Performed: Essays in Honor of R.A. Foakes (Grace Ioppolo, ed., University of Delaware Press, 2000)

English book editors
University of California, Los Angeles faculty
British expatriate academics
Shakespearean scholars
2013 deaths
1923 births
People educated at West Bromwich Grammar School